Saint-Amarin is a commune in the Haut-Rhin department in Grand Est in north-eastern France.

Geography
Saint-Amarin territory tops in the Storkenkopf (1366  m).

See also
 Communes of the Haut-Rhin department

References

Communes of Haut-Rhin